Stadionul Viitorul may refer to two Romanian stadiums.

 Stadionul Viitorul (Ovidiu) 
 Stadionul Viitorul (Scornicești)